Sapps Still is an unincorporated community in Coffee County, Georgia, United States.

History
Sapps Still was developed as the site of a turpentine still in the early 1900s. A community developed around the turpentine still to provide housing and provisions to support the still workers and their families. The still exploded due to a fire and was replaced by a lumber mill that was built in its place. Ruins and remains of both facilities still stand. The kiln for drying the lumber sawn at the mill remains standing as well having been repurposed as a hay barn after the mill closed in the 1950s. A rail spur [1] that passed through Sapps Still connected the barge and steamboat wharf on the Ocmulgee River at Relee, five miles to the north, with the county seat of Douglas, and from there to other rail lines. The rail spur was used to transport naval stores from the turpentine still and later, lumber from the lumber mill. The Relee-to-Sapps-Still line closed in 1950, and the Sapps-Still-to-Douglas line closed in 1958.[2]

Geography
Sapps Still is located at 31°42'58"N 82°56'15"W (31.7160206, -82.9373684).  The highest elevation is 322'.[3]  Sapps Still sits at the junction of Sapps Still Road (Coffee County unimproved road #498)[4] and US Highway 441.  Sapps Still is 131 miles driving distance NW of Jacksonville, Florida; 180 miles driving distance SE of Atlanta, Georgia; and 98 miles driving distance SE of Macon, Georgia.  An abandoned telephone long-distance microwave relay tower stands approximately one-half mile south of Sapps Still on the east side of US Highway 441, and is often cited as a landmark.[5]

References
 Map of Georgia and Florida Railways and Connections in 1918 from Official Guide of the Railways, April 1918; Georgia's Railroad History & Heritage. Retrieved 2010-6-28.
 Abandonments  Georgia and Florida Railway, Georgia's Railroad History & Heritage. Retrieved 2010-6-28.
 USGS Geographic Names Information System (GNIS) Feature Detail Report for Sapps Still, GA Retrieved 2010-6-28.
 Georgia DOT County Maps (Downloadable PDF) Retrieved 2010-6-28.
 Trails.com Topo Map showing Sapps Still and microwave radio tower.  Retrieved 2010-6-29.
 Ward, Warren P.. Ward's history of Coffee County : A story dealing with the past and present of Coffee County.  Beginning with the early settlers about the year 1800,--discussing the Creek Indians and the Pioneers.  Leading up to the creation of Coffee County in 1854—Old families, old schools and churches, showing the conditions during the Civil War and ending up with the spirit of progress, which is evident in better schools, and a more intelligent civilization.  Showing that Coffee County, in South Georgia is God's country and a good place to live in the year 1930.  Press of Foote & Davies Co., Atlanta, copyright 1930.  Retrieved 2010-7-11.

External links
 1955 railway line & waterway map of Coffee County - Galileo
 Coffee County Georgia Wikipedia Article
 Coffee County, Cities and Counties, The New Georgia Encyclopedia
 Coffee County statistical data at City-Data.com 
 RailGa.com - Georgia's Railroad History and Heritage 
 GeorgiaInfo Maps - Georgia Place Names - Coffee County

Sapps Still
Unincorporated communities in Georgia (U.S. state)